The Victoria Terminal Railway and Ferry Company (VTRF) was a shortline railway company operating two railway lines and a connecting ferry that linked Vancouver Island and the south arm of the Fraser River in Metro Vancouver.

Construction & interchange
In March 1901, the Great Northern Railway (GN) acquired a controlling interest in the VV&E, owner of the VTRF, which in October commenced work on a railway line in Victoria. In 1902, the VTRF acquired the Victoria and Sidney Railway. In 1903, the VTRF opened the short Cloverdale–Port Guichon railway link, and commenced the Port Guichon–Sidney train ferry that connected with the Victoria and Sidney Railway.

Cloverdale was an interchange on the New Westminster Southern Railway Company (NWSR), a GN subsidiary, which at the time connected today's Pacific Highway Border Crossing with Brownsville (Surrey docks). In 1904, the New Westminster Bridge replaced the Fraser River ferry crossing to New Westminster, from which point the Vancouver, Westminster and Yukon Railway charter predicated access to Downtown Vancouver, where the GN station stood immediately to the north of the existing Pacific Central Station.

Operation & demise
The daily ferry service that operated during the early years also carried railway freight cars. The VTRF train terminal, initially on the wharf, moved to Savoy St in 1924, and was used for about five more years. The limited passenger service to Ladner ended in the 1930s. The primary freight item was cattle. In 1943, the Ladner Fisherman's Co-operative Association purchased the station for a meeting hall. In the 1960s, the building, which holds a historic places designation, was substantially enlarged. The eastern part of the Cloverdale–Ladner right-of-way forms an east–west section of the BC Rail track to Roberts Bank Superport.

Ladner passenger rail

See also

Footnotes

References

Defunct British Columbia railways